La Glorieuse is the fifth ship in the  of patrol vessels within the French Navy. She is the last vessel of her class still in service with the French Navy but is due to be decommissioned in May 2023.

Service history 

La Glorieuse was launched on 25 January 1985. On 31 October 2013, thanks to detection by a Falcon 200 Gardian surveillance aircraft, La Glorieuse intercepted an armed Chinese fishing boat operating illegally in the New Caledonia exclusive economic zone (EEZ). On 13 November the same year she took part in a maritime surveillance operation in the Pacific Ocean in support of the frigate , then in preparation for surveillance operations in the same zone. In March 2015 she set out to assist the inhabitants of Vanuatu affected by cyclone Pam.

References

External links
 La Glorieuse on the Marine Nationale website

1985 ships
Patrol vessels of the French Navy